Roberto Mario "Robert" Fano (11 November 1917 – 13 July 2016) was an Italian-American computer scientist and professor of electrical engineering and computer science at the Massachusetts Institute of Technology. He became a student and working lab partner to Claude Shannon, whom he admired zealously and assisted in the early years of Information Theory.

Early life and education
Fano was born in Turin, Italy in 1917 to a Jewish family and grew up in Turin. Fano's father was the mathematician Gino Fano, his older brother was the physicist Ugo Fano, and Giulio Racah was a cousin.  Fano studied engineering as an undergraduate at the School of Engineering of Torino (Politecnico di Torino) until 1939, when he emigrated to the United States as a result of anti-Jewish legislation passed under Benito Mussolini.  He received his S.B. in electrical engineering from MIT in 1941, and upon graduation joined the staff of the MIT Radiation Laboratory.  After World War II, Fano continued on to complete his Sc.D. in electrical engineering from MIT in 1947. His thesis, titled "Theoretical Limitations on the Broadband Matching of Arbitrary Impedances", was supervised by Ernst Guillemin.

Career
Fano's career spans three areas, microwave systems, information theory, and computer science.

Fano joined the MIT faculty in 1947 to what was then called the Department of Electrical Engineering.  Between 1950 and 1953, he led the Radar Techniques Group at Lincoln Laboratory. In 1954, Fano was made an IEEE Fellow for "contributions in the field of information theory and microwave filters". He was elected to the American Academy of Arts and Sciences in 1958, to the National Academy of Engineering in 1973, and to the National Academy of Sciences in 1978.

Fano was known principally for his work on information theory.  He developed Shannon–Fano coding in collaboration with Claude Shannon, and derived the Fano inequality. He also invented the Fano algorithm and postulated the Fano metric.

In the early 1960s, Fano was involved in the development of time-sharing computers. From 1963 until 1968 Fano served as the founding director of MIT's Project MAC, which evolved to become what is now known as the MIT Computer Science and Artificial Intelligence Laboratory. He also helped to create MIT's original computer science curriculum.

In 1976, Fano received the Claude E. Shannon Award for his work in information theory. In 1977 he was recognized for his contribution to the teaching of electrical engineering with the IEEE James H. Mulligan Jr. Education Medal.

Fano retired from active teaching in 1984, and died on 13 July 2016 at the age of 98.

Bibliography
In addition to his work in information theory, Fano also published articles and books about microwave systems, electromagnetism, network theory, and engineering education.  His longer publications include:

"The Theory of Microwave Filters" and "The Design of Microwave Filters", chapters 9 and 10 in George L. Ragan, ed., Microwave Transmission Circuits, vol. 9 in the Radiation Laboratory Series (with A. W. Lawson, 1948).
Electromagnetic Energy Transmission and Radiation (with Lan Jen Chu and Richard B. Adler, 1960).
Electromagnetic Fields, Energy, and Forces (with Chu and Adler, 1960).

References

External links

 Oral history interview with Robert M. Fano 20 April 1989.  Charles Babbage Institute University of Minnesota.  Fano discusses his move to computer science from information theory and his interaction with the Advanced Research Projects Agency (ARPA). Topics include: computing research at the Massachusetts Institute of Technology (MIT); the work of J.C.R. Licklider at the Information Processing Techniques Office of ARPA; time-sharing and computer networking research; Project MAC; computer science education; CTSS development; System Development Corporation (SDC); the development of ARPANET; and a comparison of ARPA, National Science Foundation, and Office of Naval Research computer science funding.
  from 1964, demonstrating the Compatible Time-Sharing System (CTSS).
 

1917 births
2016 deaths
Italian computer scientists
American information theorists
Italian information theorists
Jewish American scientists
Members of the United States National Academy of Engineering
Members of the United States National Academy of Sciences
American people of Italian-Jewish descent
Italian refugees
20th-century Italian Jews
Engineers from Turin
20th-century American engineers
MIT School of Engineering alumni
MIT School of Engineering faculty
Fellow Members of the IEEE
Fellows of the American Academy of Arts and Sciences
MIT Lincoln Laboratory people
Microwave engineers
American telecommunications engineers
Italian emigrants to the United States